Leonard "Aghahowa" Tsipa (born 25 January 1982) is an international Zimbabwean football striker that plays in the Zimbabwe Premier Soccer League side CAPS United F.C.

Club career 
In 2002, together with his CAPS teammate Blessing Makunike, he went to Serbia, to play with FK Javor. They played in the 2002–03 First League of Serbia and Montenegro but the club finished 12th and was consequently relegated to the second league for the following season. After not getting much chances to play, both returned to CAPS United F.C., where they achieved major success by winning, in 2004 and 2005, the Zimbabwe Premier Soccer League titles. He played most of his career with CAPS, the exceptions were only his spell in Serbia in 2003, and when he played one season in 2008 with previous year Zimbabwean champions Dynamos F.C. managing to finish that season runners-up, however the goal that season was the CAF Champions League where they reached the record semi-finals in 2008 edition. For the 2011 season he moved to the 2010 Zimbabwean champions Gunners F.C. In 2015, he moved back at Caps United fc and he still in Caps United to date.

Tsipa usually plays as a striker or as a winger.

National team 
By May 2011 Leonard Tsipa has played five matches for the Zimbabwean national team and scored one goal.

Honours 
CAPS United
Zimbabwe Premier League (3): 2004, 2005, 2016
Zimbabwean Cup (1): 2004
Dynamos Harare
CAF Champions League semi-finals: 2008

References 
 
 Leonard Tsipa at Srbijafudbal

1982 births
Living people
Sportspeople from Harare
Zimbabwean footballers
Zimbabwe international footballers
CAPS United players
Dynamos F.C. players
FK Javor Ivanjica players
First League of Serbia and Montenegro players
Expatriate footballers in Serbia
Zimbabwean expatriate footballers
Association football forwards